The Selenge–Orkhon forest steppe ecoregion (WWF ID: PA0816) stretches across north central Mongolia, and follows the Selenga River northeast into Russia. The ecoregion is itself at high elevations, but surrounded by higher mountain ranges. As a transition zone between taiga (to the north) and steppe, it features conifer forests on the north slopes of mountains, and pine/aspen stands on southern slopes.

Location and description 
The ecoregion spans roughly 1,000 km, from the Khan-Khokhi mountains in the Baruunturuun district of western Mongolia, to Ulan-Ude, the capital city of Buryatia in Russia, just east of Lake Baikal.  Along the way it passes through the drainage basin of the upper Selenge River and its tributaries, the valley of the Orkhon River, and along the Selenge River Valley into Russia.  In the middle, the ecoregion wraps around the higher forested area of the Khangai Mountains.  The mean altitude of the area is 800–1200 meters, with peaks ranging up to 2900 meters.

Climate 
The region has a dry-winter subarctic climate (Köppen classification Dwc), although it borders closely on both a dry-winter humid continental climate (Dwb) and on a cool semi-arid climate (BSk). There is sufficient precipitation (averaging up to 300 mm/year) to support sparse stands of trees, surrounded by steppe vegetation.

Flora and fauna 

Northern slopes of mountains in the ecoregion feature coniferous forests, while the southern slopes typically feature “open steppe” forest stands that are primarily Scots pine (Pinus sylvestris) and aspen (Populus tremula). About 40 percent of the area is dominated by Stipa cleistogenes (feathergrass).

Protections 
The ecoregion is under pressure from grazing. There are relatively few protected areas for an ecoregion of its size. One is Khan-Khokhi Khyargas Mountain National Park, which covers much of the Khan Khokhii mountains, a small (100 km-long) mountain range northeast of Khyargas Nuur (Lake).

See also 
 List of ecoregions in Russia
 List of ecoregions in Mongolia

References 

Ecoregions of Mongolia
Ecoregions of Russia
Palearctic ecoregions
Temperate grasslands, savannas, and shrublands